Chronius Mons is a shield volcano located on Eridania quadrangle of the planet Mars. The name Chronius Mons is a classical albedo name. This was approved by International Astronomical Union on September 13, 2006.

References 

Eridania quadrangle
Volcanoes of Mars